Sir Richard Augustine Studdert Redmayne   (22 July 1865 – 27 December 1955) was a British civil and mining engineer. Redmayne worked as manager of several mines in Britain and South Africa before becoming a professor at the University of Birmingham. He was a leading figure in improving mine safety in the early twentieth century and would become the first Chief Inspector of Mines, leading investigations into many of the mine disasters of his time. He became the president of three professional associations, namely the Institution of Mining and Metallurgy, the Institution of Professional Civil Servants and the Institution of Civil Engineers.

Redmayne was the author of several books documenting coal mining practice in the twentieth century, one of which was acknowledged as a standard reference text for other engineers. His work in mine safety and increasing mine output during the First World War was acknowledged with an appointment as Knight Commander of the Order of the Bath, chevalier of the French Legion of Honour and a companion of the Order of St John of Jerusalem. Throughout his life he was a dedicated civil servant and served on many of the inter-war committees for the Imperial Mineral Resources Bureau and the Ministry of Transport.

Mining engineer 

Redmayne was born at Low Fell, Gateshead, County Durham, England, the son of Jane Anna Fitzgerald (Studdert) and John Marriner Redmayne, an alkali manufacturer. He received an education at Durham College of Science in Newcastle upon Tyne before being apprenticed to William Armstrong, a mining engineer, at Hetton Colliery in Pittington. He was elected a student member of the North of England Institute of Mining and Mechanical Engineers on 13 December 1884 and obtained a First Class Certificate of Competency as a Manager of Mines on 28 October 1887. Redmayne became an under-manager at Hetton before transferring to South Africa in 1891, where he became the manager of Walmsley Collieries near Newcastle, Colony of Natal. Whilst in South Africa he became a member of the Federated Institution of Mining Engineers. Returning to Britain in 1894 he became the manager of a colliery at Seaton Delaval in Northumberland.

Academic career 

In 1902 Redmayne was given the chair in mining engineering at the newly founded University of Birmingham. Whilst there Redmayne sought to promote universities as a means of training engineers over the more traditional apprenticeship system. Under his direction the university became the first in the country to house an ore dressing laboratory and a model underground coal mine. During his professorship Redmayne sat on several committees and inquiries investigating safety procedures and working practice in coal mines. These included the committee which recommended an eight-hour day for coal workers implemented as the Eight Hour Act in 1906 and the Royal Commission into accident prevention in 1908 which also resulted in tighter safety regulations. From 1908 to 1913 Redmayne was appointed a commissioner to inquire into mine disasters at the Hamstead, Maypole, South Moor, Whitehaven, Little Hulton, Cadeby and Senghenydd. The disasters he investigated caused a loss of 1250 lives in total. In recognition of his work improving mine safety Redmayne was invested as a Knight Commander of the Order of the Bath in the 1914 Birthday Honours.

Government work 

Redmayne resigned from the university in 1908 to take up a job at the Home Office as the first Chief Inspector of Mines. Perhaps his most significant achievement in this role was his work with Sir Malcolm Delevingne in bringing about the Coal Mines Act 1911 which significantly increased the safety of mines. During the first part of the First World War Redmayne served as head of the Production Department of the Control of Coal Mines. From 1917 to 1919 he was the chief technical advisor to the Controller of Coal Mines and in 1919 acted as an assessor to Sir John Sankey who was the chairman of the Royal Commission on Coalmines. From 1918 he was also the chairman of the Imperial Mineral Resources Bureau, resigning as chief inspector in 1919 to dedicate more time to the bureau and to set up a private engineering consultancy. He chaired the bureau's examination and entry board from 1912 until 1950.

Redmayne continued to sit on government committees well into his old age and was the independent chairman of the National Conciliation Board on Road Motor Haulage from 1934 until 1938 and as chairman of the Road Haulage Wages Board from 1938 until 1941.

Professional institutions 

Redmayne was an active member of many institutions throughout his life, starting with his election as a student member of the North of England Institute of Mining and Mechanical Engineers in 1884. He became a member of the Federated Institution of Mining Engineers in 1889 and would be elected an honorary member in 1909. He was elected to the presidency of the Institution of Mining and Metallurgy in 1916, the first of several such offices. In 1922, during his tenure as chairman of the Imperial Resources Bureau, he became the first president of the Institution of Professional Civil Servants an office to which he was successfully re-elected every year until his death. He served as president of the Institution of Civil Engineers for the 1934-5 session and was a fellow of the Geological Society. He was also made Chevalier of the Legion of Honor and a companion of the Order of St. John of Jerusalem.

Publications 

Redmayne was the author of several publications during his lifetime. The first of these was his co-authorship of Colliery Working and Management with Harrison Bulman which was acknowledged as a standard text and was reprinted several times. His five volume Modern Practice in Mining is a comprehensive account of the coal mining industry of his time and was written from 1908 to 1932. His autobiography Men, Mines and Memories was written in 1942 and his account of the war, The British Coal Mining Industry During the War was written in 1923.

Later life 
In 1898, Redmayne married Edith Rose Richards, with whom he would father one son, John, and two daughters.

He died, aged ninety, at his home in Little Hadham, Hertfordshire on 27 December 1955.

His great-grandsons are the award-winning actor Eddie Redmayne and the cricketer James Redmayne.

References 

        
        
        
        
        

        

1865 births
1955 deaths
People from Gateshead
Engineers from Tyne and Wear
People from Little Hadham
British people of English descent
British people of Irish descent
Alumni of Durham University
Academics of the University of Birmingham
British civil engineers
British mining engineers
Presidents of the Institution of Civil Engineers
Presidents of the Smeatonian Society of Civil Engineers
Chevaliers of the Légion d'honneur
Knights Commander of the Order of the Bath
Richard
People from County Durham (before 1974)